Hayride to Hell is a 1995 Australian short subject directed and written by Kimble Rendall. It tells the story of salesman George Weygate, who comes across a girl begging for his help. Only shown in late night art houses, the film has never been widely released. It is believed that Kylie Minogue became involved in the project as a favour to the director, whom she would work with five years later on the film Cut (2000).

Plot summary

The film's lead character George Weygate (Richard Roxburgh), a kind family man, meets a young woman while driving home from work, the girl (Kylie Minogue) suggests she is suffering from a diabetic seizure and demands him to take her to a block of flats as soon as possible to fictional Walker Street, in Sydney's Darlinghurst. He complies, but is left wondering what is going on. When they reach their destination, the girl departs from the car without saying a word, heading towards the block of flats. Weygate, realizing that she left her belongings in the back of his car, goes after her to return them to her. After finding her apartment, he realizes that he has been mysteriously locked in. In an effort to escape he begins to scale the building. A neighbour tries to stop his escape, but is unsuccessful. He later discovers the girl slumped on the floor in the building's elevator. He goes to help her, but she screams at him for stealing her bag. Eventually he manages to escape the building and returns home.

Cast
Kylie Minogue: The Girl
Richard Roxburgh: George Weygate
Chloe Angel: Weygate Child
Patsy Flanagan: Buelgie Woman
Daphnee King: Neighbour
Victoria Longley: Hilary Weygate
Scott Love: Detective #2
Ellie MacCarthy: Weygate Child
Iris Shand: Old Woman
Ross Sharp: Detective #1

External links
Hayride To Hell at the National Film and Sound Archive
Hayride to Hell at Internet Movie Database
 

Hayride to Hell
Australian drama short films
1990s English-language films
1990s Australian films